The Burke County Courthouse in Bowbells, North Dakota, was built in 1928. It was designed by the Minneapolis firm of Toltz, King, and Day, who also designed the Barnes County Courthouse and the Ward County Courthouse.

It was listed on the National Register of Historic Places in 1985 for its significance in county history and for its architecture.

References

Courthouses on the National Register of Historic Places in North Dakota
County courthouses in North Dakota
Federal architecture in North Dakota
Government buildings completed in 1928
1928 establishments in North Dakota
National Register of Historic Places in Burke County, North Dakota